Tin Can Alley may refer to:

Tin Can Alley, a toy and British carnival game
Tin Can Alley (album), by Jack DeJohnette
Tin Can Alley, Kentucky, an unincorporated community in Harlan County